John F. Kennedy College was founded in 1965 in Wahoo, Nebraska, United States, one of six colleges started by small-town businessmen on the model of Parsons College in Fairfield, Iowa. The college was named after President John F. Kennedy.  Due to a drop in enrollment and financial difficulties following the end of the military conscription draft in 1973, Kennedy College closed in 1975.

Athletics

JFK College was a pioneer in intercollegiate women's athletics. The softball team won the first three Women's College World Series championships in 1969–71. (They were excluded from the tournament in 1972 by a rule change that barred schools from appearing in the WCWS if it gave scholarships to any women athletes, not just softball players—JFK openly awarded women's basketball scholarships).

The women's basketball team, winners of several AAU titles, helped to further the diplomatic thaw in Sino-American relations in 1973 by representing the U.S. on a tour of games in the People's Republic of China, which was the subject of an article in Sports Illustrated. The basketball team also advanced to the final game of the National Women's Invitational Tournament in 1972, 1973 and 1974, falling to the same team (Wayland Baptist) each year.

Parsons Plan
The "Parsons Plan" academic model was the brainchild of Millard Roberts, the president of Parsons College from 1955 to 1967. The multi-faceted plan featured innovative teaching and administrative techniques, and emphasized the recruitment of a geographically and academically diverse student body.  Among other characteristics, the "Parsons Plan" schools welcomed unconventional students who had not seen success at other colleges.  In the 1960s, the schools were also attended by a substantial number of young men seeking draft deferments that would allow them to avoid military service during the Vietnam War.

Current usage
In 2004 a private physician bought the former library for use as an office. Since then, several buildings have been renovated.

References

External links
 Kennedy College alumni website

Defunct private universities and colleges in Nebraska
Educational institutions established in 1965
1975 disestablishments in Nebraska
1965 establishments in Nebraska
Educational institutions disestablished in 1975